Paikuse was a municipality located in Pärnu County, one of the 15 counties of Estonia.

Settlements
Borough
Paikuse
Villages
Põlendmaa, Seljametsa, Silla, Tammuru, Vaskrääma.

References

 
Former municipalities of Estonia